The first presidential inauguration of Juan Manuel Santos marked the first term of the presidency of Juan Manuel Santos, an administration that would later be postponed for four more years. The ceremony was attended by 3,000 guests including several heads of state and government of the world.

Ceremony
Around 3:30 p.m. m. Santos began the tour from the San Carlos Palace, headquarters of the Colombian Ministry of Foreign Affairs, to the Plaza de Bolívar accompanied by his family. The journey was enlivened by songs whose lyrics alluded to the Government of National Unity, and children in typical costumes and flags of the departments of Colombia. On the way, a commission of 30 senators and representatives to the chamber, elected in plenary session, were waiting for him and who were entrusted by protocol with notifying the president that the congress was ready for possession.8 This is because by mandate of the constitution the President of Colombia takes office before the latter.

While this was happening, the guests at the inauguration, among them 16 Heads of State and of government and Prince Felipe of Asturias, settled into their places, minutes later the arrival of the President  Álvaro Uribe who was invited to the possession by Juan Manuel Santos

The ceremony began with President Álvaro Uribe as head of state sitting between the president of the Chamber of Representatives Carlos Alberto Zuluaga and the president of the Senate Armando Benedetti, Juan Manuel Santos as president-elect was located at the left side of Armando Benedetti. The first point of the day was the Hymn of Colombia performed by the lyrical singer Valeriano Lanchas and the Clara Luna Choir. The singer Sol Escobar also participated, singing the song for peace for the ceremony

Pre-inaugural events 
The official events of the possession began with the visit of the president-elect to the Sierra Nevada de Santa Marta for a symbolic possession before the Mamos of the Kogui, Arhuacos, Wiwas and Kankuamos indigenous communities, inhabitants of the place. And in the hours in the afternoon in Bogotá The ceremony of transmission of command, the recognition of the troops, the arrival at the Casa de Nariño where the guests were greeted and the possession of the Ministerial Cabinet

Reception 
In the moments before the ceremony of inauguration, Juan Manuel Santos had lunch and a religious ceremony with his relatives and other people. Santos met with the Prince of Asturias at the headquarters of the Ministry of Foreign Affairs of Colombia.

Presence of world leaders
The ceremony of transmission of command of Juan Manuel Santos as president of Colombia was attended by 15 Heads of State and Government. 

  – President Cristina Fernández de Kirchner
  - President Luiz Inácio Lula da Silva
  – President Laura Chinchilla
  - President Leonel Fernández
  – President Rafael Correa
  - President Mauricio Funes
  - President Mikheil Saakashvili
  – President Álvaro Colom
  – Prime Minister Jean-Max Bellerive
  – President Xiomara Castro
  – Prime Minister Bruce Golding
  - President Felipe Calderón
  – President Ricardo Martinelli
  – President Alan García
  – HRH The Prince of Asturias

See also
 2010 Colombian presidential election
 Juan Manuel Santos
 Angelino Garzón
 Second inauguration of Juan Manuel Santos

References

Santos, Juan Manuel
2010 in Colombia
2010 in politics
August 2010 events in South America